Kalinga University is a private university located in Naya Raipur, Chhattisgarh, India. It was established in the year 2011.

Academics
The university has following faculties:
Faculty of Commerce and Management 
Faculty of Engineering and Technology
Faculty of Information Technology
Faculty of Science
Faculty of Arts
Faculty of Law
Faculty of Pharmacy
Faculty of system management

References

External links

Private universities in India
Universities in Chhattisgarh
Education in Raipur, Chhattisgarh
2011 establishments in Chhattisgarh
Educational institutions established in 2011